Trampling may refer to:
 Trampling, the effect on soil, vegetation and ground structures
 Trampling (sexual practice)
 Trampling during stampedes

Trample may also refer to:
 Lady Trample (born 1991), New Zealander skater

See also 
 Trampled (disambiguation)